Trà Ôn is a rural district of Vĩnh Long province in the Mekong Delta region of Vietnam. It is known particularly for its pomelos, which are called bưởi Năm Roi. As of 2003 the district had a population of 149,983. The district covers an area of 258 km². The district capital lies at Trà Ôn.

References

Districts of Vĩnh Long province